Lazzarotto is an Italian surname. Notable people with the surname include:

Enrico Lazzarotto (born 1973), Italian slalom canoeist
Giuseppe Lazzarotto (born 1942), Italian Roman Catholic titular archbishop
Poty Lazzarotto (1924–1998), Brazilian artist

See also 
 Lazzarato

Italian-language surnames